Rachel and Leah (2004) is the third novel in the Women of Genesis series by Orson Scott Card.

Plot introduction 
Rachel and Leah follows the story of Jacob through the eyes of Rachel and Leah. Card expands the story into a novel of over 300 pages, so many of the details and characters are fictional.  However, the storyline does not deviate from the story told in Genesis.

See also 
 List of works by Orson Scott Card
 Orson Scott Card

External links 
 About the novel Rachel and Leah from Card's website

2004 American novels
Novels by Orson Scott Card
Historical novels
Sequel novels
Novels based on the Bible
Jacob
Forge Books books
Novels set in the 10th century BC